Zulma Aurora Faiad (born February 21, 1944 in Buenos Aires, Argentina) is an Argentine vedette and actress.

Biography

Zulma Faiad grew up with her sister Virginia Faiad in the bosom of an Argentine middle-class family. Her father was Jacinto Faiad, of Lebanese descent. Her parents separated when she was still very young. Her father was an accountant, and worked several hours a day, so her mother, Aurora de Faiad was in charge of giving her artistic training. At age seven, she entered the school of the Teatro Colón, where she studied choreography and perfected her acting vocation with the theater.

At the beginning of the decade of the 1960, she began as an advertising model and her protagonist participation in a television advertisement of an oil brand gave birth to the affectionate popular nickname of "La Lechuguita" alluding to the characterization that she made. From the Teatro Maipo where she worked, she moved to the Teatro Nacional Cervantes.

She worked with comedians Juan Carlos Mesa and Adolfo Stray. She was one of the three famous "Singles" of Channel 13.

In cinema she had a prolific career, acting in 17 films.

In Mexico she participated in several films, of which the most remembered are those in which she acted next to Mauricio Garcés. She had traveled to Mexico for forty days and ended up staying seven years. She also worked as an exclusive figure on commercials for PEMEX.

During the 70's and early 80's she ventured with great success as a vedette in theater shows, alongside stars such as Nélida Lobato, Dario Vittori, Silvia Legrand, Osvaldo Martínez, Carmen Barbieri and Moria Casán.
In Mexico, she made her debut on the theatrical stages in 1969, in a play along with Maria Victoria and Marco Antonio Muñiz.

In 1990, she participated as an actress in some television shows. Already withdrawn from the theater and from the television screen, since 2000 she hosted her own radio program at dawn, where she stood out for her Christian spiritual messages. She was also called by Marcelo Tinelli to be a juror at Bailando por un Sueño.

Since 2015, she performs in the Aldo Funes play, Mujeres de ceniza.

She entered without success in politics. She was a candidate for first national deputy by the City of Buenos Aires, as a member the Partido de la Esperanza Porteña political party, in the legislative elections of October 23, 2005.

Personal life
She had two well-known relations: The first one was with Melchor Arana, with whom she lived the 7 years abroad. The second was with Daniel Guerrero, with whom she married in Mexico, and with whom he had her two daughters, Daniela and Eleonora, the latter a talented singer. Her sister, Virginia Faiad, a few years younger than herself, has also, but less assiduously, ventured into acting and magazine.

Filmography

Films
 1963: Rata de puerto
 1964: Las mujeres los prefieren tontos o Placeres conyugales
 1965: El perseguidor
 1965: Nacidos para cantar
 1965: Ritmo nuevo y vieja ola
 1965: Psique y sexo
 1965: Villa Delicia, playa de estacionamiento, música ambiental
 1965: Los ratones
 1966: La buena vida
 1966: Necesito una madre
 1967: La cigarra está que arde
 1968: La cama
 1969: Al rojo vivo
 1969: Amor libre
 1969: Espérame en Siberia vida mía
 1969: Modisto de señoras
 1970: Un amante anda suelto
 1970: Préstame a tu mujer
 1971: Los corrompidos
 1971: Siete Evas para un Adán
 1971: El ídolo 
 1972: Rosario
 1972: Disputas en la cama
 1972: En esta cama nadie duerme
 1972: La noche de los mil gatos
 1973: Cumbia
 1973: El castillo de las momias de Guanajuato
 1973: La casa del amor
 1974: La flor de la mafia
 1974: El amor infiel
 1974: Las viboras cambian de piel
 1979: Las golfas del talón
 1983: La pulga en la oreja
 1988: Matrimonios... y algo más '88
 1991: La risa está servida

Television
 Solamente vos (2013) ... Miriam
 Bailando por un Sueño  (2006)
 Floricienta (2004) ... Titina
 Resistiré (2003)
 Costumbres argentinas (2003)
 ¿Quién es Alejandro Chomski? (2002)
 Señoras sin señores (1998)
 Ciudad prohibida (1997)
 Cada día una mujer (1996) ... Lunes
 Por siempre mujercitas (1995)
 Fiesta y bronca de ser joven (1992)
 Matrimonios y algo más (1987) ... various characters
 Sola (1983)
 El superejecutivo Don Jacobo (1968), with Adolfo Stray

References

External links 
 

Living people
Argentine people of Lebanese descent
Argentine film actresses
Mexican film actresses
Argentine vedettes
Mexican vedettes
People from Buenos Aires
1944 births
Actresses from Buenos Aires
Bailando por un Sueño (Argentine TV series) judges